Destrage are an Italian progressive metalcore band, formed in 2002. They have released five studio albums (with a new release, SO MUCH. too much, due September 2022) and are currently signed to 3DOT Recordings. after leaving their previous label, Metal Blade Records.

Members
Paolo Colavolpe - vocals
Matteo Di Gioia - guitar
Ralph Salati - guitar
Federico Paulovich - drums

Former Members
Gabriel Pignata - bass

Discography

Studio albums
Urban Being (2007)
The King Is Fat'n'Old (2010)
Are You Kidding Me? No. (2014)
A Means to No End (2016)
The Chosen One (2019)
SO MUCH. too much (2022)

References

External links

Italian progressive metal musical groups
Italian metalcore musical groups
Metal Blade Records artists
Musical groups from Milan